Dazhongsi Station is a station on Line 13 of the Beijing Subway. The namesake for the station is the nearby Big Bell Temple (Da Zhong Si).

Station Layout 
The station has 2 elevated side platforms.

Exits 
There are 2 exits, lettered A and B. Both are accessible.

References 

Railway stations in China opened in 2002
Beijing Subway stations in Haidian District